Newark Northgate railway station (alternatively Newark North Gate) is on the East Coast Main Line in the United Kingdom, serving the town of Newark-on-Trent, Nottinghamshire. The station is Grade II listed.

Newark-on-Trent is a market town, 25 miles (40 km) east of Nottingham. Newark has another station, Newark Castle, operated by East Midlands Railway and closer to the town centre.

History

The station is on the Great Northern Railway Towns Line from Peterborough to Doncaster which opened on 15 July 1852,  the easier to construct Fens Loop Line via Boston and Lincoln had opened two years earlier.

The station opened without any ceremony. The first train of passengers from the north arrived at 6.38 am and those from the south arrived at 8.05 am. There was a coal depot, goods warehouse and sheds to accommodate 4 locomotives.

The station became a junction in 1879 with the opening of the Great Northern Railway branch to Bottesford, built as a northern extension of the Great Northern and London and North Western Joint Railway which opened at the same time. Services from Newark were provided to Northampton or Leicester and also to Nottingham. Services onto the joint line from Newark were withdrawn by 1922. The line was much used for through goods, especially between Newark and Northampton. The joint line closed in 1962 except for isolated fragments, but the Newark to Bottesford Junction section survived until 1988.

On 9 July 1928, King George V and Queen Mary arrived at the station from King's Cross where they were received by the 6th Duke of Portland.

The short connection to the Newark Castle to Lincoln line was opened in 1965 by British Rail to maintain a link between the East Coast Main Line and Lincoln following the closure of the branch from the latter to Grantham. This remains in use today by trains to Lincoln and Grimsby.

Station masters

Mr. Easterfield ca. 1861 - 1882 (afterwards station master at Stamford)
Alfred Mason 1882 - 1895
Arthur Joseph Pott 1895 - 1902 (afterwards station master at Grantham)
Charles Cooper 1902 - 1910 (formerly station master at Essendine)
John Thomas Chandler 1910 - 1925
F.G. Allen 1925 - 1930 (formerly station master at Trowse)
Robert Bruntlett 1930 (afterwards station master of London Road, Manchester)
Edwin Oliver Wright 1930 - 1932 (afterwards station master at Lincoln)
William Ewart Nott 1944 - ????
Robert Maurice Shand 1951 - 1955 (formerly station master at Mallaig, afterwards station master at Leeds Central)

Newark Flat Crossing
The station is just south of the Newark Flat Crossing, one of the few remaining flat railway crossings in the UK. The East Coast Main Line is crossed by the Nottingham-Lincoln line. There are plans to grade-separate the crossing by providing a flyover for east–west services, with a shallow enough gradient to accommodate freight trains. A key geographical constraint on the construction of a flyover will be the proximity of the site to the River Trent and the A1 trunk road. The benefits of a flyover would include higher capacity on both the East Coast Main Line and the Nottingham-Lincoln line, for both passengers and freight; journey time improvements; and a more reliable timetable. Network Rail's final Route Utilisation Strategy for the East Midlands estimated that a flyover would have a benefit:cost ratio of 1.4, with further benefits which could not be taken account of in the standard project appraisal procedures. The RUS recommended that the provision of a flyover at Newark was further developed in Control Period 4 (2009–2014) to refine the infrastructure costs and potential benefits, with the possibility of constructing it in Control Period 5 (2014–2019).

Services

The station has 3 platforms and is served by trains operated by London North Eastern Railway and East Midlands Railway. Platforms 1 and 2 serve intercity trains to London, Newcastle and Edinburgh with platform 3 serving trains to Lincoln.

The typical off-peak service in trains per hour is:
 2 tph to 
 1 tp2h to  
 1 tph to  via 

Station name
There has been significant ambiguity about the correct form of the station's name. Physical signage on and around the station refer to "Newark Northgate" whilst some booking systems refer to "Newark North Gate". On exiting the station, the old British Rail sign says just "Northgate" and road signs towards the station say 'Northgate' along with local businesses and the bus companies.

Station car parks
There are three car parks in the immediate area for the railway station. They are operated by the railway car parks and National Car Parks (NCP).

Railway Northgate Car Park - 289 spaces

NCP Northgate Car Park - 371 Spaces

Of the three main car parks in the area, the NCP and the Railway car parks are the most conveniently situated for the railway station facilities.

Notes

References
Body, G. (1986), PSL Field Guides - Railways of the Eastern Region Volume 1, Patrick Stephens Ltd, Wellingborough, 
National Rail
NCP Newark Northgate Station Car Park

External links

NCP Newark Northgate Station Car Park

Railway stations in Nottinghamshire
DfT Category C1 stations
Former Great Northern Railway stations
Railway stations in Great Britain opened in 1852
Railway stations served by East Midlands Railway
Railway stations served by London North Eastern Railway
Newark-on-Trent
Grade II listed buildings in Nottinghamshire
Grade II listed railway stations
1852 establishments in England